Charles R. Berger was an American professor emeritus of communication at the University of California, Davis. Berger died on September 25, 2018, from health complications arising from cancer.

Education 

Berger received his B.S. in Psychology from Pennsylvania State University. After completing his undergraduate studies, he attended Michigan State University where he received his M.A. and Ph.D. in Communication.

Career 

He was a Fellow and former president of the International Communication Association. Berger was best known for his formulation of uncertainty reduction theory.

His research interests included message production processes and the processing of threat-related messages by intuitive and rational systems.

He was the former editor of Human Communication Research and co-editor (with Sandra Ball Rokeach) of Communication Research. He was a member of several editorial boards of communication journals. He also was an area editor for the International Encyclopedia of Communication.

He was a Fellow and a Past President of the International Communication Association. He was a co-recipient (with Judee Burgoon) of NCA's Mark Knapp Award.
Berger lived in Davis, California with his wife.

Uncertainty reduction theory 
Charles Berger was an integral part in formulating the uncertainty reduction theory. The uncertainty reduction theory explains how humans utilize communication strategies to lower uncertainty regarding other human beings. This theory begins to understand the differences in strategies that people use in order to make conversations as well as communication go as smooth as possible. Humans want to stray away from uncertainty and awkwardness so they will employ various communicative techniques. This strategy was introduced by Berger in 1975 and furthered his focus on the study of interpersonal communication. Berger's findings led to the understanding of the uncertainty reduction theory and allowed people to take a deeper look in people's interactions with one another. Furthermore, Berger was able to bring understanding to why and how we use various communicative strategies to lower uncertainty between each other.

Publications 

Berger has published over 100 articles and book chapters. He co-edited the first edition of the Handbook of Communication Science with Steven H. Chaffee.  He Co-edited the second edition of the Handbook of Communication Science with Michael Roloff and David R. Ewoldsen.

Books

Papers

See also 

 Communication theory
 Communication studies
 Uncertainty reduction theory

References

External links 
 UC Davis: Search: People
 https://web.archive.org/web/20181010011129/http://communication.ucdavis.edu/people/fzberger
 http://www.sagepub.com/authorDetails.nav?contribId=532243

21st-century American psychologists
Communication theorists
2018 deaths
University of California, Davis faculty